

Education
 Total immersion in bilingual education.

Companies
Total Immersion (augmented reality), Augmented reality software solutions with D'Fusion
Total Immersion, Total Immersion Swimming